Joseph P. McDonald (born July 21, 1966) is an American politician serving in the Minnesota House of Representatives since 2011. A member of the Republican Party of Minnesota, McDonald represents District 29A northwest of the Twin Cities metropolitan area, which includes the cities of Delano and Rockford and parts of Wright, Meeker, and Hennepin Counties.

Early life, education, and career
McDonald was born in Watertown, Minnesota. His father, K. J. McDonald, served as a Minnesota state representative from 1977 to 1991, representing the old legislative districts 35A and 35B. 

McDonald graduated from Hennepin Technical College with an A.A. in photography. He earned his Master's degree in photography in 2003 and his Craftsman's degree in photography in 2008. He is a photographer and business owner.

McDonald was a member of the Delano School Board and served on the city council from 2000 to 2006 and as mayor from 2007 to 2010. He is also active in the local Lions Club, the American Legion, the Knights of Columbus, the chamber of commerce, the Jaycees, and the Fourth of July committee.

Minnesota House of Representatives
McDonald was elected to the Minnesota House of Representatives in 2010, after incumbent Tom Emmer resigned to run for governor of Minnesota, and has been reelected every two years since. He serves as the minority lead for the Labor and Industry Finance and Policy Committee and sits on the Higher Education Finance and Policy Committee.

Electoral history

References

External links 

 Rep. McDonald Web Page
 Project Votesmart – Rep. Joe McDonald Profile
 Joe McDonald Campaign Web Site

1966 births
Living people
People from Wright County, Minnesota
Republican Party members of the Minnesota House of Representatives
American photographers
21st-century American politicians
People from Watertown, Minnesota
Catholics from Minnesota